Mursili I (also known as Mursilis; sometimes transcribed as Murshili) was a king of the Hittites  1620-1590 BC, as per the middle chronology, the most accepted chronology in our times, (or alternatively c. 1556–1526 BC, short chronology), and was likely a grandson of his predecessor, Hattusili I. His sister was Ḫarapšili and his wife was queen Kali.

Accession 
Mursili came to the throne as a minor. Having reached adulthood, he renewed Hattusili I's warfare in northern Syria.

Conquest of Yamhad (Aleppo) 
He conquered the kingdom of Yamhad and its capital, Aleppo, which had eluded Hattusili. He then led an unprecedented march of 2,000 km south into the heart of Mesopotamia, where in 1595 BC he sacked the city of Babylon. Mursili's motivation for attacking Babylon remains unclear, though William Broad has proposed that the reason was obtaining grain because the clouds from the Thera eruption decreased the Hittites' harvests.

Sack of Babylon 
The raid on Babylon could not have been intended to exercise sovereignty over the region; it was simply too far from Anatolia and the Hittites' center of power. It is thought, however, that the raid on Babylon brought an end to the Amorite dynasty of Hammurabi and allowed the Kassites to take power, and so might have arisen from an alliance with the Kassites or an attempt to curry favor with them. It might also be that Mursili undertook the long-distance attack for personal motives, namely as a way to outdo the military exploits of his predecessor, Hattusili I.

Assassination 
When Mursili returned to his kingdom, he was assassinated in a conspiracy led by his brother-in-law, Hantili I (who took the throne), and Hantili's son-in-law, Zidanta I. His death inaugurated a period of social unrest and decay of central rule, followed by the loss of the conquests made in Syria.

In popular culture
Mursili I is a playable leader (as the Latinized form "Mursilis") of the Hittite state in the 2001 video game Civilization III.

See also

 History of the Hittites

References

Reign of Mursili I
Trevor Bryce, The Kingdom of the Hittites, Oxford: University Press (1998)

16th-century BC rulers
16th-century BC murdered monarchs
Hittite kings
Assassinated royalty
Ancient murdered monarchs
Year of birth unknown